I Remember Patsy is the twenty-ninth solo studio album by American country music singer-songwriter Loretta Lynn. It was produced by Owen Bradley, who produced many of Patsy Cline's hits. The album was released on April 4, 1977, by MCA Records.

Commercial performance 
The album peaked at No. 2 on the Billboard Top Country Albums chart. The album's first single, "She's Got You", peaked at No. 1 on the Billboard Hot Country Songs chart, Lynn's tenth solo single to top the chart. The second single, "Why Can't He Be You", peaked at No. 7.

Recording 
Recording sessions for the album took place on September 28 and December 1 and 10, 1976, at Bradley's Barn in Mount Juliet, Tennessee. Two songs on the album were recorded during previous recording sessions. "I Fall to Pieces" was recorded on June 11, 1975, during a session for 1975's Home. "She's Got You" was recorded during the June 30, 1976, session for Somebody Somewhere. The album's closing track, "I Remember Patsy...A Conversation", is an excerpt from an interview from circa 1976; an exact recording date is unknown.

Track listing

Personnel 
Harold Bradley – bass
Owen Bradley – producer
David Briggs – piano
Johnny Christopher – guitar
Lloyd Green – steel guitar
Johnny Gimble – fiddle
The Jordanaires – backing vocals
Mike Leech – bass
Kenny Malone – drums
Grady Martin – guitar
 Charlie McCoy – harmonica, vibes
Hargus Robbins – piano
Hal Rugg – steel guitar
Pete Wade – guitar
Bobby Wood – piano

Chart positions 
Album – Billboard (North America)

Singles – Billboard (North America)

References 

1977 albums
Loretta Lynn albums
MCA Records albums